Elena Ivanova (born 1979) is a Russian figure skater.

Elena Ivanova or Yelena Ivanova may also refer to:

Elena Ivanova (sprinter), Paralympic sprinter
Elena Ivanova (long jumper) (born 1961), Russian long jumper
Yelena Ivanova (swimmer) (born 1963), Soviet swimmer
Yelena Ivanova (diver) (born 1973), Kazakhstani diver
Elena P. Ivanova, Russian biophysicist